Sam Murphy is the name of:
Samantha Murphy (born 1997), American soccer player
Sam Murphy (rugby league) (born 1981), Australian rugby league player